Reinwardtiodendron humile is a small tree species in the family Meliaceae. There are no subspecies listed in the Catalogue of Life.

Description 
They are shrubs to trees, typically 3-6 (to 27) m in height. Branches are greyish-white to brownish grey.  
Leaves: 120–200 mm; with petiole and rachis adaxially flat, abaxially rounded; leaflets generally in number of 3 or 5, sub-opposite or opposites; petioles 3–5 mm; thin elliptic to oblong-lanceolate, 60-100 × 25–40 mm, coriaceous, both surfaces glabrous and glossy.  
The female flowers are sessile, globose, 2–3 mm in diameter, axillary in the apical part of the branches, in spikes; rachis thin, finely grooved, with scattered flowers. 
The fruit is a berry of 17-20 × 12–13 mm, pubescent brown outside, with 1 or 2 seeds: from February–March.

Distribution
It is found in thickets of the mountainous regions of: Hainan, Cambodia, Indonesia, Laos, Malaysia, the Philippines, Thailand and Vietnam.

References

Flora of Indo-China
Trees of Vietnam
Meliaceae